Elections to Dungannon District Council were held on 20 May 1981 on the same day as the other Northern Irish local government elections. The election used four district electoral areas to elect a total of 20 councillors.

Election results

Note: "Votes" are the first preference votes.

Districts summary

|- class="unsortable" align="centre"
!rowspan=2 align="left"|Ward
! % 
!Cllrs
! % 
!Cllrs
! %
!Cllrs
! %
!Cllrs
! % 
!Cllrs
!rowspan=2|TotalCllrs
|- class="unsortable" align="center"
!colspan=2 bgcolor="" | UUP
!colspan=2 bgcolor="" | SDLP
!colspan=2 bgcolor="" | DUP
!colspan=2 bgcolor="" | IIP
!colspan=2 bgcolor="white"| Others
|-
|align="left"|Area A
|bgcolor="40BFF5"|33.3
|bgcolor="40BFF5"|2
|29.4
|1
|19.4
|0
|0.0
|0
|17.9
|1
|5
|-
|align="left"|Area B
|15.4
|1
|19.0
|1
|8.3
|0
|0.0
|0
|bgcolor="#CDFFAB"|57.3
|bgcolor="#CDFFAB"|3
|5
|-
|align="left"|Area C
|bgcolor="40BFF5"|38.2
|bgcolor="40BFF5"|3
|23.0
|1
|23.7
|1
|0.0
|0
|15.1
|0
|5
|-
|align="left"|Area D
|bgcolor="40BFF5"|37.7
|bgcolor="40BFF5"|2
|10.3
|0
|19.9
|1
|18.8
|1
|13.3
|1
|5
|-
|- class="unsortable" class="sortbottom" style="background:#C9C9C9"
|align="left"| Total
|31.0
|8
|20.5
|3
|17.7
|3
|4.6
|1
|26.2
|5
|20
|-
|}

Districts results

Area A

1977: 2 x UUP, 2 x SDLP, 1 x DUP
1981: 2 x UUP, 1 x SDLP, 1 x DUP, 1 x Independent Republican
1977-1981 Change: Independent Republican gain from SDLP

Area B

1977: 2 x SDLP, 1 x UUP, 1 x Independent Nationalist, 1 x Independent Republican
1981: 2 x Independent Nationalist, 1 x SDLP, 1 x UUP, 1 x Independent Republican
1977-1981 Change: Independent Nationalist leaves SDLP

Area C

1977: 3 x UUP, 1 x SDLP, 1 x DUP
1981: 4 x UUP, 1 x SDLP
1977-1981 Change: DUP gain from UUP

Area D

1977: 2 x Independent, 1 x UUP, 1 x SDLP, 1 x DUP
1981: 2 x UUP, 1 x DUP, 1 x IIP, 1 x Independent Nationalist
1977-1981 Change: UUP and IIP gain from Independent (two seats), Independent Nationalist leaves SDLP

References

Dungannon and South Tyrone Borough Council elections
Dungannon and South Tyrone